This is a partial discography of Richard Wagner's opera Die Walküre. It was first performed at the National Theatre Munich on 26 June 1870.

Recordings

References
Notes

Sources
Operaclass Die Walküre discography, accessed 19 November 2009

Opera discographies
Der Ring des Nibelungen
Operas by Richard Wagner